Vanilla Unity (Hangul: 바닐라 유니티) is a South Korean rock band. Formed in 2004, the band consists of Lee Seungju on vocals, Kim Younghoon on guitar, Lee Jeonghak on guitar, Kim Minseon on bass guitar, and Jo Seongjoon on drum.

In 2004, the same year they formed, the band won third prize at the  K-rock Championship and received a special award for best new band. In 2005, they signed to the rock label Gom Entertainment.  In January 2006, they released their debut album, Love.

Their song, "IF", is featured on the Music game DJMax Portable 3 and DJMax Technika 3 by the South Korean company, Pentavision. They also have a song called “Tomorrow” that was featured in the soundtrack of the kdrama Princess Hours (or Goong).

Members

Events
 Sapiens 4th Anniversary Concert

Discography

Albums 
 Love - (2006)
 Farewell & Tonight - (2007)
 Commonplace - (2008)
 We Are Rising - (2011)

References

External links
 Official website
 Vanilla Unity profile on Mnet
 

South Korean indie rock groups
Musical groups established in 2004